Vladislav Adolfovitch Rusanov (born June 12, 1966) is a fantasy writer, candidate of technical sciences (1999). Writes in Russian language. Also is known for translations of fantasy and romantic poetry into Russian. Formerly a Ukrainian citizen he now identifies with the Donetsk People's Republic.

When the Donetsk People's Republic proclaimed itself as an independent state from Ukraine, he expressed support of the breakaway republic, and became one of the founders of the Donetsk People's Republic Writers' Union,

Bibliography
Hot Winds Of North
Dawn's Gust (2004)
Midday Storm (2005)
Sunset's Hurricane (()) (2005)

Blades Of Boundaries
The Damned Cargo (2006)
The Revenge Will Not Be() (2006)

Dragons Slayer
The Stepchild of Destiny (2006)
The Hostage of Fortune() (2007)

Bronze griffin
Bronze Griffin (2007)
Silver Bear (2007)
Golden Boar (2008)
Steel Thrush (2008)

Warlock
Warlock of Gardarika (2008)
Rites of Warlock (2009)
Messenger from Moscow (2010)
Roads and destinies (2011)

References

External links
Vladislav Rusanov's short stories in http://www.zhurnal.lib.ru magazine
Vladislav Rusanov's LiveJournal blog

Ukrainian writers
Ukrainian fantasy writers
1966 births
Living people
Ukrainian people of Russian descent
People of the Donetsk People's Republic